Megaphyllum unilineatum is a species of millipede in the family Julidae, first described by Carl Ludwig Koch in 1838. No subspecies are listed in the Catalogue of Life.

References

External links
picture of M. unilineatum
video of M. unilineatum

Julida
Millipedes of Europe
Animals described in 1838